Saint Marys, Indiana may refer to:

Saint Marys, Floyd County, Indiana
Saint Marys, Franklin County, Indiana

See also
Saint Mary-of-the-Woods, Indiana
Saint Mary's College (Indiana)